The 2014–15 Botola was the 58th season of the Moroccan Top League and the 4th under its new format of Moroccan Pro League.

Teams locations

League table

Season statistics

Top goalscorers
.

Annual awards 
The Royal Moroccan Football Federation, in coordination with the LNFP ( Ligue Nationale du Football Professionnel) and the UMFP (Union Marocaine des Footballeurs Professionnels), organized the 1st edition of the "Stars' Night" in honor of the players and coaches who were distinguished during the 2014/2015 season.

See also
 2014–15 GNF 2

References

External links

Fédération Royale Marocaine de Football
Botola on fifa.com

Botola seasons
Morocco
1